Class 2 may refer to:

 BR Standard Class 2 2-6-0, British steam locomotive
 BR Standard Class 2 2-6-2T, British steam locomotive
 Class 2 Touring Cars, FIA classification for cars in auto racing
 Classes of U.S. Senators
 L&YR Class 2, British 4-4-0 steam locomotive designed by William Barton Wright
 L&YR Class 2 (Aspinall), British 4-4-0 steam locomotive designed by John Aspinall
 NSB El 2, Norwegian electric locomotive
 NSB Di 2, Norwegian diesel locomotive
 SCORE Class 2, off-road racing vehicles
 A contribution class in the National Insurance system in the UK
 The second class in terms of hiking difficulty in the Yosemite Decimal System
 A speed class rating for Secure Digital cards
 A class in the electrical Appliance classes

See also
 Class II (disambiguation)
 Class 02 (disambiguation)

de:Klasse 2